Bethel is a village in Tate Township, Clermont County, Ohio, United States. The population was 2,711 at the 2010 census. Bethel was founded in 1798 by Obed Denham as Denham Town, in what was then the Northwest Territory. Bethel is the home of the first movie theater in Ohio which was founded in 1908.

Gallery

History
Bethel was originally called Plainfield, and under the latter name was platted in 1798. The town site was replatted in 1802 under the name Bethel. The present name is after Bethel, a city in the Hebrew Bible. A post office in Bethel has been in operation since 1815.

Geography
Bethel is located at  (38.963171, -84.081787).

Demographics

2010 census
As of the census of 2010, there were 2,711 people, 1,052 households, and 681 families living in the village. The racial makeup of the village was 97.3% White, 0.4% African American, 0.1% Native American, 0.1% Asian, 0.4% Pacific Islander, 0.1% from other races, and 1.6% from two or more races. Hispanic or Latino of any race were 1.0% of the population.

There were 1,052 households, of which 39.4% had children under the age of 18 living with them, 40.3% were married couples living together, 18.8% had a female householder with no husband present, 5.6% had a male householder with no wife present, and 35.3% were non-families. 30.2% of all households were made up of individuals, and 14.7% had someone living alone who was 65 years of age or older. The average household size was 2.56 and the average family size was 3.16.

The median age in the village was 33.8 years. 29% of residents were under the age of 18; 9.1% were between the ages of 18 and 24; 26.4% were from 25 to 44; 22.4% were from 45 to 64; and 12.9% were 65 years of age or older. The gender makeup of the village was 46.5% male and 53.5% female.

2000 census
As of the census of 2000, there were 2,637 people, 1,012 households, and 682 families living in the village. The population density was 1,969.2 people per square mile (759.8/km2). There were 1,099 housing units at an average density of 820.7 per square mile (316.7/km2). The racial makeup of the village was 98.29% White, 0.11% African American, 0.19% Native American, 0.19% Asian, and 1.21% from two or more races. Hispanic or Latino of any race were 0.72% of the population.

There were 1,012 households, out of which 40.3% had children under the age of 18 living with them, 46.5% were married couples living together, 15.1% had a female householder with no husband present, and 32.6% were non-families. 29.2% of all households were made up of individuals, and 14.8% had someone living alone who was 65 years of age or older. The average household size was 2.59 and the average family size was 3.22.

In the village, the population was spread out, with 31.9% under the age of 18, 8.5% from 18 to 24, 30.9% from 25 to 44, 15.8% from 45 to 64, and 13.0% who were 65 years of age or older. The median age was 31 years. For every 100 females there were 87.2 males. For every 100 females age 18 and over, there were 81.9 males.

The median income for a household in the village was $31,385, and the median income for a family was $38,448. Males had a median income of $31,829 versus $23,844 for females. The per capita income for the village was $15,071. About 16.4% of families and 20.1% of the population were below the poverty line, including 26.9% of those under age 18 and 20.1% of those age 65 or over.

Education
Bethel has a public library, a branch of the Clermont County Public Library.

Notable people
 Libbie C. Riley Baer (1849–1929), poet
 Ulysses S. Grant - President of the United States and Commanding General of the United States Army
 Ulysses S. Grant Jr. - attorney and entrepreneur, a son of President Grant
 Thomas Morris - U.S. Senator from Ohio
 Steven M. Newman - the World Walker
 Dick Scott - Cincinnati Reds pitcher

References

External links

 

Villages in Clermont County, Ohio
Villages in Ohio